Marg Downey (born 5 May 1961) is an Australian comedian and actress best known for her roles in The D Generation, Fast Forward and Full Frontal

Early life and education
Downey grew up in a middle-class Catholic family in the Melbourne suburb of East Malvern in an eight-child family. Her father worked as a chartered accountant. She attended Sacré Cœur School with fellow comedian Jane Turner in Glen Iris, and then studied Arts/Law at the University of Melbourne, where she resided at Newman College. At university, she began to perform in university revues, and auditioned for performing arts courses at the National Institute of Dramatic Art, the Victorian College of the Arts and the University of Melbourne, but was not successful in gaining entry to any of them.

Career
Downey first rose to prominence in the sketch comedy program The D-Generation on the Australian Broadcasting Corporation in the late 1980s. She subsequently appeared in later sketch comedy series with other members of The D-Generation, including Fast Forward, Full Frontal and Something Stupid. In these, she was known for her portrayals of a news anchor, a stern SBS presenter and for her spot-on impression of current affairs host Jana Wendt. Her spoof of "The What's On SBS Presenter" satirised the eccentricity of SBS programming, displaying grim masochistic determination to "not miss a moment of this scintillating entertainment".

Downey starred in the 2001 Network 10  comedy series  Sit Down, Shut Up, playing the role of Principal Sue; American comedian  Kenan Thompson repeated Downey's role in the 2009 American Fox television re-make of the original Australian series, produced and written by Mitch Hurwitz, of Arrested Development fame.

In 2005, Downey was cast as a regular player in Seven's live comedy sketch show Let Loose Live, but the show was cancelled after just two episodes due to low ratings. The following year, she appeared in the sketch show Magda's Funny Bits alongside Magda Szubanski. In this show, she recreated her role as infomercial host Janelle, first developed on Fast Forward.

In 2018, she voiced Stanley "Stan" Stinkleton and the narrator in the kids TV series, Kitty Is Not a Cat.

Comedy style

Downey's television roles are often authority figures or professional women with slightly eccentric personalities, such as Principal Sue in Sit Down, Shut Up and the "relationship-counselor"  Marion  seen in comedy series Kath & Kim.  On Fast Forward, Marg Downey appeared in a lot of sketches with Steve Vizard, such as Eyeball News, The Midday Show, Candid Camera, The Cosby Show and Get Smart. Downey also played Clancy in the Skippy send-up, and appeared in send-ups of I Dream Of Jeannie, Mr Ed and Bewitched.

Select filmography
 Open Slather (2015) – various characters
Kath & Kimderella (2012)
Very Small Business (2008)
Magda's Funny Bits (2006)
Let Loose Live (2005)
Kath & Kim (2002–2004)
Under the Radar (2004)
The Real Thing (2002)
Blue Heelers (1995–2002)
Gloria's house (2000)
Queen of the Damned (Talamascan) (2002)
The Bob Downe Show (2001)
Sit Down Shut Up (2001)
The Late Report (1999)
Something Stupid (1998)
The Silver Brumby (1994-1998)
Economy Class (1994)
Full Frontal (1993)
Bligh (1992)
The D Generation Goes Commercial (1988–1989)
Fast Forward (1989)
The D-Generation (1986–1987)

References

External links

Australian women comedians
Australian television actresses
Living people
1961 births
Comedians from Melbourne
University of Melbourne women
20th-century Australian actresses
20th-century Australian comedians
21st-century Australian actresses
21st-century Australian comedians